The Cyber Safety Review Board (also called the Cybersecurity Safety Review Board) was established by the United States Secretary of Homeland Security. Modeled after the National Transportation Safety Board, it will meet in cases of significant cybersecurity incidents. The board's creation was announced upon President Joe Biden's signing of Executive Order 14028 on May 12, 2021.

The Board serves a deliberate function to review major cyber events and make concrete recommendations that would drive improvements within the private and public sectors. The Board’s construction is a unique and valuable collaboration of government and private sector members, and provides a direct path to the Secretary of Homeland Security and the President to ensure the recommendations are addressed and implemented, as appropriate. As a uniquely constituted advisory body, the Board will focus on learning lessons and sharing them with those that need them to enable advances in national cybersecurity.

The CSRB is composed of 15 highly esteemed cybersecurity leaders from the federal government and the private sector that make up the inaugural board membership:

 Robert Silvers, Under Secretary for Policy, Department of Homeland Security (Chair) 
 Heather Adkins, Vice President, Security Engineering, Google (Deputy Chair)
 Dmitri Alperovitch, Co-Founder and Chairman, Silverado Policy Accelerator and Co-Founder and former CTO of CrowdStrike, Inc.
 Chris DeRusha, Federal Chief Information Security Officer, Office of Management and Budget 
 Chris Inglis, National Cyber Director, Office of the National Cyber Director
 Rob Joyce, Director of Cybersecurity, National Security Agency 
 Katie Moussouris, Founder and CEO, Luta Security
 David Mussington, Executive Assistant Director for Infrastructure Security, Cybersecurity and Infrastructure Security Agency 
 Chris Novak, Co-Founder and Managing Director, Verizon Threat Research Advisory Center
 Tony Sager, Senior Vice President and Chief Evangelist, Center for Internet Security
 John Sherman, Chief Information Officer, Department of Defense
 Bryan Vorndran, Assistant Director, Cyber Division, Federal Bureau of Investigation
 Kemba Walden, Assistant General Counsel, Digital Crimes Unit, Microsoft 
 Wendi Whitmore, Senior Vice President, Unit 42, Palo Alto Networks

The first report of the board was published 11 July 2022 and described Log4j and Log4shell.

References 

Presidency of Joe Biden
United States executive orders